Alan Hall was convicted of murdering 52 year old Arthur Easton in 1985 in what has been described as one of New Zealand's worst miscarriages of justice. 

Easton and his two teenage sons were attacked by an intruder who broke into their house carrying a Swiss bayonet. All three were stabbed during the incident and Arthur Easton bled to death shortly thereafter. The intruder was described by Easton's sons and other witnesses as Māori, 6 feet tall and strong. Alan Hall was a 5ft7, slightly-built, asthmatic and Pākehā.

As part of their investigation, police went from house to house in the neighbourhood seeking information. When they met Hall, he admitted he used to own a bayonet. Police then subjected him to lengthy interrogations without a lawyer. Hall was vulnerable due to being autistic - although this was not diagnosed until many years later. Under pressure from the police, he gave conflicting information about what had happened to his bayonet. 

There was no evidence linking Alan Hall to the scene of the crime. Hall had no injuries, despite the murder occurring in a violent incident in which one of Easton's sons smashed a squash racket over the intruder's head multiple times until the squash racket was deformed and broken in two. At the trial, the police suppressed testimony from Easton's children that the intruder was Maori and failed to call a witness who also said he saw a Maori man running away from the house at the time. The police altered the written statement from this witness leaving out the ethnicity of the man he saw running away, while adding other erroneous, incriminating information about Alan Hall into the statement. At the trial, the judge read the altered statement to the jury unaware that it had been altered by the police. Police also failed to disclose to the defence information about another suspect which the defence could have used to challenge the Crown's case against Hall.

Aged 23, Hall was found guilty and sentenced to life in prison. He was released on parole after nine years, but 18 years later, in 2012, he was recalled after breaching one of his parole conditions. He was released again in March 2022, ten years later. Altogether, he spent 19 years in prison before the Supreme Court of New Zealand acknowledged a substantial miscarriage of justice had occurred and overturned his conviction on 8 June 2022.

Background 
Arthur Easton and his teenage sons, Brendan and Kim, were attacked in their home in Auckland, New Zealand on 13 October 1985. Brendan, aged 16 at the time, was in his bedroom studying when he heard a noise at the back door. When he went to investigate, he found an intruder had broken in. An altercation occurred and Brendan screamed for help. His father was in the lounge watching television and came rushing out. His older brother, Kim also joined in the struggle. During the incident, Arthur Easton was stabbed with a bayonet multiple times. Eventually, the offender fled, but left behind three pieces of evidence – a bayonet covered in blood, a woollen beanie and a single muddy footprint. Mr Easton bled to death in the hallway half an hour later. His sons were both injured but survived.

Easton's sons described their attacker to police as a strong, six-foot Māori man, who did the stabbing with his right hand.  Another eyewitness, Ronald Turner, told police he saw someone running away from the Easton's home at the time and also described the man as Māori. Alan Hall came to police attention two months later when they were door knocking in the area looking for information. Hall acknowledged he had been out walking in an area located 1.5 km from the crime scene that night and that he owned a bayonet and beanie similar to the ones found at the scene.

He was described at the time as "simple and intellectually backward". His mother described him as frail, awkward and shy. At the trial, the two Easton boys who had been attacked did not identify Hall as the intruder, and none of the sightings of someone running away from the scene matched his description. His finger prints were not found at the scene nor on the bayonet. Nevertheless, he was found guilty and sentenced to life in prison.

Hall was released on parole in November 1994 and remained in the community for the next 18 years.

Recall 

Hall was recalled to prison in 2012 after concerns were raised by police and his probation officer that he had been filming rugby league matches and other sporting fixtures – even though this was done with the school’s permission. For the next ten years, prison authorities insisted he complete an intensive child sex offender treatment programme. 

Hall objected to this, saying he didn't understand why it was necessary. As a result, he was refused parole numerous times. In 2019, Hall was finally diagnosed with Autism Spectrum Disorder (ASD) and expert testimony indicated that this may explain some of his behaviour. The Parole Board took this into account and decided his risk of reoffending was very low and released him for a second time, on 2 March 2022.

Conviction overturned 
Over the 19 years he spent in prison, Hall always maintained he was innocent and appealed his conviction five times. This included three requests for a pardon under the royal prerogative of mercy. As the years went by, a new investigative team, including Tim McKinnel (who helped free Teina Pora), helped to uncover the actions and omissions of the police that led to Hall’s conviction.

Based on these findings, in January 2022, Hall appealed to the Supreme Court. His conviction was finally overturned in June 2022, three months after he had been released on parole. At the hearing, his lawyer, Nick Chisnall said "It is indisputable that Mr Turner’s statement was intentionally altered. Evidence was tampered with to ensure it conformed with the Crown's theory of the case, that Mr Hall was the murderer. This was grave misconduct."

Errors in prosecution

Evidence withheld 
On the way to gaining a conviction, evidence from four witnesses was withheld from the judge and the jury. Turner, who saw the intruder running away, told the police a number of times that the man he saw was Māori. Police specifically questioned him about this aspect of his evidence, but then declined to call him to testify at the trial. Instead, they got him to sign a written statement which was then read to the jury. However, the police altered his statement before presenting it to the court, removing his statement that the man he saw was Māori. Turner was unaware the police had changed his statement until two years later – after Hall had been found guilty. The police also withheld from the court statements from Easton's two sons that the intruder was Māori and failed to disclose testimony (about the intruder's ethnicity) from the ambulance officer who spoke with Brendon and Kim Easton when attending at the house on the night of the fatality.

By the time this deception was discovered, Hall had already appealed his conviction and lost. When his conviction was finally overturned in 2022, the Supreme Court noted that as a result of the altered evidence put forward by the police and prosecution, "the trial, the appeal to the Court of Appeal in July 1987, and Mr Hall's first application for the exercise of the prerogative of mercy, were all undertaken without counsel for Mr Hall being aware that Mr Turner had described a man leaving the scene of the crime who could not have been Mr Hall, a Pākehā male".

False evidence added 
Not only did the police remove this information from Turner's statement, they also added something into it he hadn't said. The altered statement claimed Turner had been shown and identified a blue sweatshirt which belonged to Hall; and that Turner had said this matched the sweatshirt of the man he saw running away. When he realized his statement had been altered, Turner said the police never showed him a sweatshirt. Hall did own a blue sweatshirt, but the receipt showed it was purchased in December 1985, two months after the murder took place. Hall's sister told the court that Hall had been wearing a red sweatshirt when he went out for a walk that particular night. 

In 2022, when the Supreme Court finally overturned Hall's conviction, the Court said: "The Crown accepts that, if the statement had not been inappropriately and deliberately altered in the way it was, then the jury would have heard evidence that a man who, on Mr Turner’s evidence could not have been Mr Hall, was seen leaving the location of the fatality at the relevant time".

Other suspects 
At the trial in 1985, the prosecutor also told the court that all other suspects had been eliminated by the police. This included one suspect who had an extensive criminal history, including violence, and was known to have committed burglaries in the neighborhood on the night of the murder. When the Supreme Court finally overturned Hall's conviction in 2022, it said "the police should have disclosed evidence which tended to implicate the other suspect. The defence... had not been provided with all of the available information, including what led police to treat him as a suspect in the first place".

Autism and vulnerability 
When Hall was arrested, police subjected him to lengthy interrogations, on one occasion for eight hours, and another for 15 hours, without a lawyer or support person present. He gave a number of different answers about no longer having the bayonet and his beanie in his possession, and these differing explanations were seen as evidence of guilt. It was not until 2019, 34 years after the murder, while he was still in prison, that Hall was diagnosed with autism. Owing to this condition, psychiatrist Dr Allely, highlighted concerns "about Mr Hall's ability to cope with the type of questions, the length of the interviews, and about his ability to appropriately respond". Hall's lawyer said the police and prosecution exploited his vulnerability and subjected him to an oppressive and unfair interrogation. Private investigator, Tim McKinnel, was also involved in Teina Pora's case, said it would have been obvious to the police that Hall was vulnerable and they took advantage of that.

Subsequent failures by the Crown 
In 1987, two years after the murders, Hall appealed his conviction with the help of defence lawyer, Peter Williams. The appeal was unsuccessful. However, in 1998 important material establishing the basis for a miscarriage was disclosed to Hall and his legal team under the Official Information Act.

The Ministry of Justice 
Four years later Williams presented an application for the Royal prerogative of mercy, providing proof that witness statements had been doctored and concealed by the police. Williams was described as “shattered and disbelieving” that the Ministry of Justice and the Crown simply ignored this new information.

Investigation by Bryan Bruce 
In 2009, documentary maker Bryan Bruce investigated Hall’s case. Lawyer Gary Gotlieb told the Star-Times that after Bruce's documentary aired, people came forward with more information, including former police officers concerned about how the case was handled. One officer contacted Bruce anonymously suggesting Hall had been "set up" because Police wanted a quick result. He said some police officers believed they knew who the real killer was and that he had got away with it. Bruce concluded his broadcast saying that the "engineering of a false statement to go before the jury, and dubious experiments to change witness evidence, were the most blatant example of official tampering he had ever seen".

Investigation by Mike Wesley-Smith 
In 2018, the Hall family, invited journalist Mike Wesley-Smith to look through numerous boxes containing records of the family’s lengthy fight to clear Alan’s name. Information in the boxes not only showed that Hall was highly unlikely to have been the murderer,  it also showed the authorities had known for 30 years that his conviction was unsafe, but had done nothing about it. Wesley-Smith documented his findings in a podcast called Grove Road in 2018. He also approached the Ministry of Justice suggesting they take another look at the case. The Ministry had already rejected three previous applications by Hall, and refused to act. Wesley-Smith said the Ministry displayed "a complete absence of concern". 

In 2018, former Detective Senior Sergeant Kelvin McMinn, told Wesley-Smith that the incriminating alterations to Ronald Turner’s statement were made on the advice of the Crown prosecutor at the time. Wesley-Smith then wrote to Crown Law about the case. He provided them with court documents, Turner’s police statements, an affidavit from Turner saying his evidence had been changed without his knowledge and asked for a response to this evidence. Crown Law replied saying it wasn’t possible for the Crown to examine Hall’s conviction. 

In 2020, Wesley-Smith wrote to Crown law again raising serious concerns about the police tampering with Turner’s statements. Crown Law replied it didn’t hold any records about the case, and could not help. Despite receiving this information from Wesley-Smith, in May 2022, in response to a query from Stuff, Crown Law then denied it had any knowledge about the case. They said they had “no record of being notified by anyone that Mr Turner’s statement was altered, prior to receiving documentation from [Alan Hall’s lawyer] relating to the current [Supreme Court] appeal in January 2022.

The Solicitor-General is responsible for the conduct of Crown prosecutions. Una Jagose was solicitor general at the time (in 2018) but it was not until Hall's conviction was overturned four years later, in 2022, that she decided to launch an investigation into the Crown’s role in Hall’s wrongful conviction.

Acquittal by Supreme Court 
In January 2022, Hall's defence team appealed to the Supreme Court. Because the trial and original appeal had occurred so many years earlier, the Supreme Court would only agree to an appeal if Crown Law supported the application. Remarkably, on behalf of Crown Law, Madeleine Laracy and Emma Hoskin finally conceded Hall had suffered a serious miscarriage of justice and should be acquitted. They acknowledged that the police interviews had been “unfair and oppressive” and said: “the Crown acknowledges the unacceptable truth that an unanswerable cause of miscarriage here, and of unfair trial, was deliberate failure by those responsible for the prosecution to disclose material that would have plainly been important in Mr Hall’s defence.”

When Chief Justice, Helen Winkelmann announced the Court's decision to acquit Hall, she acknowledged that there had been a substantial miscarriage of justice "either from extreme incompetence, or a deliberate strategy to achieve a conviction".

Reaction from Easton family 

Arthur Easton's family said they were "shaken and appalled by the revelations of deliberate manipulation and non-disclosure of evidence by the police and prosecution, not only at the initial trial but also during the 1987 appeal". They thanked Tim McKinnel, Alan Hall, his family, and supporters for pursuing the truth for so long and bringing the deceitful actions of the police to light; they expect the police to reopen the investigation "to bring the real killer to justice.”

Investigation into Crown Law 
On 9 June 2022, New Zealand's solicitor general, Una Jagose QC, announced an investigation would be held into the case, led by Wellington criminal barrister Nicolette Levy QC. The inquiry will investigate the circumstances whereby the crown failed to disclose crucial witness testimony to the defence; when these failures could have been identified by crown lawyers who subsequently investigated the case; and the "identify the actions or omissions of the lawyers involved between 1985 and 2022 in obtaining, and upholding, Hall’s conviction". The inquiry will also look into what Crown lawyers did with the information they were given in 2018 and 2020 by Newshub journalist Mike Wesley Smith.  Once she received Levy's report, in December 2022, Jagose said she would instead be sending it to the police for them to investigate whether any crown officials had committed any criminal offences.

Investigation into police 
The police have also launched two internal reviews of their handling of the case in 1985.
The first is a full review of the original police investigation. The second is a more targeted probe examining the circumstances around their failure to disclose all relevant evidence, the deception at the heart of Hall’s appeal.

Compensation 
Hall’s lawyer, Nicholas Chisnall, said the family would be seeking financial compensation for the 19 years he spent in prison. Compensation would need to be paid for the time he spent on parole as well as when he was in prison. Chisnall said: "If we succeed, the sum we're talking about will exceed that that's been paid in other cases by a very wide margin." His brother, Geoff Hall, said they were hoping Alan would receive between $5 and $6.5 million.

Even though the Supreme Court declared that a miscarriage of justice occurred, the government appointed retired High Court Judge Rodney Hansen to review whether Alan Hall is innocent 'on the balance of probabilities' and therefore eligible for compensation.  Following this announcement, Nick Chisnall urged Justice Minister Kiri Allan to accept the findings of Crown Law and the Supreme Court that Hall was innocent, not require him to prove his innocence all over gain, and direct Rodney Hansen to only consider how much Hall should be paid. Law professor, Kris Gledhill, said it was outrageous that Hall has to now prove his innocence to the Ministry of Justice yet again, adding that "it adds insult to the injury Hall has suffered for 37 years".

Impact on Hall's family 
Alan Hall's family was resolute in its support of Alan and fought to have his conviction overturned for 36 years. This came at a substantial cost, both emotionally and financially. Ever since her son was convicted in 1985, his mother, Shirley, spent the rest of her life advocating on his behalf. She even sold the family home in Papakura to pay for professional investigators to look into the case. She died in 2012. Twelve members of Hall’s family were present at the Supreme Court hearing at which his conviction was overturned, including his four brothers and his sister. Afterwards, Geoff indicated he was pleased with the crown’s decision to investigate what went wrong and hopes that individuals in the police and prosecution who contributed to the miscarriage will eventually be cross-examined under oath.

Broader concerns about justice in New Zealand 

Hall's lawyer, Nick Chisnall said the case "demonstrates how hard a palpably innocent person has to work to overturn a conviction”  and does not believe the investigation by Nicolette Levy will lead to significant changes in what he says is "a deeply flawed criminal justice system". Chisnall points out it took 36 years for the conviction to be overturned and that "the justice system had repeatedly turned a blind eye to Hall’s situation, despite extensive proof of what had gone wrong with his case sitting in officials' files for decades".

Tim McKinnel said “I think we need to ask some pretty serious questions about not just how the police have failed – as they have – but how the Crown failed, how Crown Law failed, how the judiciary failed – because they did – and how the whole system was able to let down not only somebody as vulnerable as Alan Hall, but the Easton family". He points out that when it comes to miscarriages of justice in New Zealand: "We're seeing the same series of issues arising again and again." He said the police develop myopia and doggedly pursue confessions, which, with a vulnerable suspect often leads to false confessions.

Christopher Stevenson, one of New Zealand’s leading criminal defence lawyers, said the few cases where the conviction is overturned is just the tip of the iceberg. He believes the known cases represent only 10% of total miscarriages of justice in New Zealand but that we never hear about these other cases.

See also
 Crime in New Zealand
 List of miscarriage of justice cases

References

External links
A radio podcast on the case from 2018
A RNZ report made on the day the conviction was quashed.

Hall
2022 in New Zealand law